Samia is both a feminine given name and a surname. Notable people with the name include:

Given name:
Samia Ahad, Pakistani chef
Samia Finnerty, American musician
Samia Gamal (1924–1994), Egyptian belly dancer and actress
Samia Ghadie (born 1982), British actress
Samia Ghali (born 1968), French politician 
Samia Halaby (born 1936), Palestinian artist
Samia Khan (born 1986), American blogger
Samia Nkrumah (born 1960) journalist, politician and daughter of Kwame Nkrumah
Samia Yusuf Omar (1991–2012), Somali sprinter
Samia Sarwar (1970–1999), Pakistani murder victim
Samia Suluhu Hassan, President of Tanzania
Samia Shoaib, British actress

Surname:
Dru Samia (born 1997), American football player
Frank Samia (born 1981), Australian rugby league player

Feminine given names